Brockwell Park is a 50.8 hectare (125.53 acres) park located south of Brixton, in Herne Hill and Tulse Hill in south London. It is bordered by the roads Brixton Water Lane, Norwood Road, Tulse Hill and Dulwich Road.

The park commands views of the skyline of the city and Central London, and hosts almost 4 million annual
visits. At the top of the hill within the park stands Brockwell Hall.

Whilst competing against multiple demands from a broad range of other interests, the entirety of Brockwell Park is a Site of Importance for Nature Conservation (SINC) of Borough Importance (Grade I), with mature trees including ancient oaks, substantial lawn areas set to meadow, and a series of lakes. As well as adding to the landscape value, these support a variety of birds, and bats including Pipistrelles, with frequent visits from rarer species like Daubentons, Noctule, Leisler's and Serotine bat.

The park is listed for its heritage value on The National Heritage List for England, Parks & Gardens, Grade II. Noted for its nineteenth-century layout as a gracious public park, the clocktower, water garden, JJ Sexby-designed walled garden and other monuments, the park provides a pleasant exploration with links to its eighteenth-century agricultural past in the hedge lines, and mature oak trees. The model village houses outside the walled garden were originally donated to London County Council by Edgar Wilson in 1943.

The Brockwell Lido, a Grade II listed art deco building near the north of the park, is an open-air swimming pool popular with swimmers and bathers. Its attached café/restaurant is also popular. Other amenities in Brockwell Park include tennis courts, a bowling green, a BMX track and a miniature railway.

Brockwell Park is open from 7.30am to 15 minutes before sunset every day.

History

The Grade II* listed Brockwell Hall was built between 1811 and 1813 when the area was part of Surrey and was the country seat of glass merchant John Blades Esq. The land and house were acquired by the London County Council (LCC) in March 1891 and opened to the public on 2 June in the following summer, led by the local MP Thomas Lynn Bristowe. At the unveiling, Bristowe died of a heart attack on the steps of the hall.

In 1901, the LCC acquired a further  of land north of the original park. In the 1920s, there were 13 cricket pitches in the park, which attracted crowds of up to 1,500. Brockwell Park was home to the Galton Institute.

During World War I it is recorded that Brockwell Park grazed a large flock of sheep. During World War II, three sites in the park were set aside for wartime food production in the form of 'Pig Clubs', built of timber and bricks salvaged from bombed houses. Pig swill for this purpose was collected from local homes.

A bust of Thomas Bristowe was returned to the park and unveiled on its 120th birthday, 2012.

The park is Grade II listed on the Register of Historic Parks and Gardens.

Festivals and shows

The park is home to the free Lambeth Country Show, which usually takes place over two days in July, attracting crowds of up to 150,000 people. A ticketed annual fireworks display, attracting 30,000 people, also takes place around November 5.

Paid-for music events have been taking place in Brockwell Park for a number of years, including Found Festival in 2016 and Sunfall Festival in 2017. As far back as 1913, it was said that, "On the whole probably the people in Brockwell Park, like those in Hyde Park and the other parks, would refuse the weaker Italian stuff and demand the Wagner over and over again".

There is local opposition of monetizing the park and the erection of a 12 foot high steel fence around the pay to enter large festivals. The park has previously hosted large-scale free to attend un-fenced music events, including an estimated crowd of 150,000 in attendance at a Rock Against Racism carnival in September 1978, headlined by Elvis Costello and The Attractions, and with "people in trees, on the roofs of the flats and on the lido wall". Costello ended his Brockwell Park performance with the song '(What's So Funny 'Bout) Peace, Love, and Understanding'. A further Rock Against Racism event including performances by Aswad and Stiff Little Fingers was also held in the park in September 1979.

In May 1981, Aswad and Pete Townshend "swigging Remy Martin brandy" headlined a TUC benefit gig for the 'People's March For Jobs' campaign, with a crowd of 70,000 in attendance. In May 1982, Brockwell Park hosted a Cannabis Law Reform Rally, including "a wicked turbo sound rig with Jah Shaka, Coxone, King Sounds and DBC Rebel Radio´s boxes all connected in a huge horseshoe". Madness also headlined a Greater London Council / CND 'Festival for Peace' in Brockwell Park in 1983, compered by John Peel, with a crowd of 30,000 in attendance. Paul Weller's new band The Style Council made only their second public appearance at this festival. Unfortunate scheduling of the support acts, meant that many arriving in Brockwell Park hoping to see The Damned had already missed their 35-minute set, and subsequent support acts, including The Style Council and Hazel O'Connor, were pelted with mud, amid chants of "We want The Damned".

In August 1984, the park hosted a GLC free festival, where Leader Ken Livingstone gave a speech, and the increasingly rowdy crowd during performances by The Fall and Spear of Destiny was calmed by poet Benjamin Zephaniah before the headline set by The Damned. One eyewitness recalls The Fall being pelted with cans during their performance, with singer Mark E. Smith narrowly dodging one effort, "about an inch from his face, when he suddenly twitched to the right and let it sail past him".

The park has also hosted reggae festivals, and the London Pride festival in 1993 and 1994. In May 1994, an Anti Nazi League Carnival in Brockwell Park featured performances by The Manic Street Preachers, The Levellers, and Billy Bragg. Between 2000 and 2004, the park even hosted an annual cannabis festival. The cannabis festival was eventually stopped in 2005 by Lambeth Council, after drug dealing at previous events.

In June 2002, Australian band Midnight Oil headlined The Fierce Festival in Brockwell Park in front of a crowd of 20,000 people. A dance event called Purple in the Park was held on the preceding day, headlined by Grace Jones, and including performances by Boy George and Yoko Ono. The two events, held over the Queen's Golden Jubilee weekend, had a capacity set at 50,000.

In January 2018, Lambeth Council announced that Field Day Festival had been given permission to hold its event in Brockwell Park. Acts lined up for June 2018 included Erykah Badu, Thundercat, and Four Tet.

Sports facilities
 The refurbished 1930s Brockwell Lido has, as well as the swimming pool, other health and fitness facilities

 An all-weather pitch
 A bowling green
 A purpose-built BMX track
 Tennis courts
 A Basketball/Volleyball court
 Grass and gravel football pitches
 Cricket nets
 A free weekly 5 km Saturday Parkrun
 5 a side football on Sunday

Family facilities

 A children's paddling pool (open in the summertime only)
 A dog free children's play area
 A miniature railway  gauge
 One O'Clock Club

Other features
 A café, inside Brockwell Hall at the top of the hill
 A walled garden with many flowers and herbs
 Community greenhouses
12 foot high steel barrier fence enclosing a 1/3 of the park (50 days per year)
 Three duck ponds

Brockwell Park in popular culture
The San Francisco band Red House Painters wrote a song about the park, named "Brockwell Park", for their 1995 album Ocean Beach. The Ocean Beach album also features an unlisted hidden track, referred to as "Brockwell Park (Part 2)".

In a 2015 Adele at the BBC TV special, singer and songwriter Adele stated that her song "Million Years Ago" is, "kind of a story about … I drove past Brockwell Park, which is a park in south London I used to live by. It’s where I spent a lot of my youth. It has quite monumental moments of my life that I’ve spent there, and I drove past it and I just literally burst into tears".

Brockwell Park is the setting for the music video of "Do Your Thing" by local band Basement Jaxx.

Brockwell Park was used as a filming base camp for the 2015 movie The Man from U.N.C.L.E directed by Guy Ritchie.

The park is a key location in Mo Hayder's crime novel The Treatment.

References

External links

Brockwell Park Community Partners
Brockwell Park Community Greenhouses
The Brockwell Park Miniature Railway
Friends of Brockwell Park
Survey of London entries on Brockwell Hall and Brockwell Park (1851)
Plan and elevations of Brockwell Hall
Image of Brockwell Hall in 1820
urban75 e-zine on Brockwell Park
Brockwell Parkrun
Sketch of Brockwell Hall and park in 1820
Clock restoration, Brockwell Park, London

1892 establishments in England
1892 in London
Grade II listed parks and gardens in London
Parks and open spaces in the London Borough of Lambeth
Former houses in the London Borough of Lambeth